Shikhamani is 2016 Indian Malayalam-language drama thriller film produced by K.K. Rajagopal under the banner of Sreeraj Cinema and directed by Vinod Guruvayoor. The film stars Chemban Vinod Jose, Mrudula Murali and J.D. Chakravarthy in the lead roles. The film was released on 29 March 2016.

Plot 
Shikhamani is an efficient railway gang-man who serves at the station which lies close to the Korangini forests. He knows each and every corner of the forest and helps the railways by clearing the obstacles that falls on the railway tracks that runs through the thick forests. Unexpectedly, a girl named Devika Raghavendra, a wanted terrorist gets injured and trapped in the Korangini forest. When Shikhamani finds her on the railtrack during his regular patrolling, she opens up before him. Eventually, he joins her side and tries to save her from the forest.

Cast 
 Chemban Vinod Jose as Shikhamani
 Mrudula Murali as Devika Raghavendra
 J.D. Chakravarthy as anti-terrorist squadron leader
 Sai Kumar
 Mukesh
 Sudheer Karamana
 Pradeep Kottayam
 Noby Marcose
 Shaju
 Sunil Sukhada
 Balaji Sarma
 Anjana Appukkuttan
 Chinnu Kuruvila

Music 

Debutant Sudeep Palanad composed the soundtrack album for the film with lyrics written by Shibu Chakravarthy. The audio was released on 30 March 2016, on the label of Satyam Audios.

Critical reception 

Veeyen for  commented, "Granted that the film talks of social issues that make criminals out of innocent young men and women, and the aftermath of an economic imbalance that without doubt prevails. But Shikhamani is a bummer of a film that leaves a series of disappointments in its wake".

References

External links 
 
 

2010s Malayalam-language films
2016 films
2016 thriller drama films
Indian thriller drama films
2016 drama films